Sam Fishburn may refer to:

Sam Fishburn (baseball) (1893–1965), American baseball player
Sam Fishburn (footballer) (born 2003), English footballer